Life in Hell is a comic strip by Matt Groening, creator of The Simpsons, Futurama, and Disenchantment, which was published weekly from 1977 to 2012. The strip features anthropomorphic rabbits and a gay couple. The comic covers a wide range of subjects, such as love, sex, work, and death, and explores themes of angst, social alienation, self-loathing, and fear of inevitable doom.

History

Life in Hell started in 1977 as a self-published comic book Groening used to describe life in Los Angeles to his friends. It was inspired by his move to the city that year; in an interview with Playboy, Groening commented on his arrival: "I got [to Los Angeles] on a Friday night in August; it was about a hundred and two degrees; my car broke down in the fast lane of the Hollywood Freeway while I was listening to a drunken DJ who was giving his last program on a local rock station and bitterly denouncing the station's management. And then I had a series of lousy jobs." In the comic book, Groening attacked what many young adults found repellent: school, work, and love. He described it as "every ex-campus protester's, every Boomer idealist's, conception of what adult existence in the '80s had turned out to be."

Groening photocopied and distributed the magazines to friends, and also sold them for two dollars a copy at the punk corner of the record store in which he worked, Licorice Pizza on Sunset Boulevard. These magazines contained comic strips, comedy sketches, letters, and photo collages. The magazine covers were humorous as well: the first issue saw Binky, a rabbit-humanoid character, standing in a cloud of smog and declaring, "What you see is what you breathe." Groening also worked real photos into the covers, such as drawings from Jules Verne's books or a picture of his family's living room.

An editor from Wet magazine bought one of the magazines and liked it, and offered Groening a spot in the magazine; soon after, in 1978, Life in Hell debuted as a comic strip in the avant-garde Wet, to which Groening made his first professional cartoon sale. The first strip, entitled "Forbidden Words", appeared in the September/October issue. Popular in the underground, Life in Hell was picked up by the Los Angeles Reader (an alternative weekly newspaper where Groening also worked as a typesetter, editor, paste-up artist and music critic) in 1980, where it began appearing weekly. Then-publisher of the Reader Jane Levine said Groening arrived at editor-in-chief James Vowell's office one day, showing him his "silly cartoons with the rabbit with one ear." After Groening left, Vowell came out of his office saying, "This guy is gonna be famous someday."

The character designs of Akbar and Jeff were, in fact, failed attempts by Groening to draw Charlie Brown. In a 1999 interview, Groening said that he added Akbar and Jeff to the comic to appease his girlfriend (who was not yet Deborah Caplan). Early on in the comic, Groening used Binky and his wife to mirror the arguments Groening himself had with this girlfriend. However, she grew irritated with Groening because she felt he was portraying her unfairly. The addition of the twin-like Akbar and Jeff was meant to act as a mask of anonymity to hide who was who in such arguments. According to Groening, however, she still told him, "You think you're Akbar, but you’re really Jeff."

In a 1991 interview about The Simpsons, Groening said that Life in Hell was done entirely by himself, describing the comic as "Matt Groening pure and simple," and explained that the strips were often weird or entirely different every week because of however he was feeling at the time of a strip's creation.

In November 1984, Groening's then-girlfriend (and co-worker at the Reader), Deborah Caplan, decided to publish a compilation of Groening's cartoons as a book entitled "Love is Hell". The book was an underground success, selling 22,000 copies in its first two printings. Caplan had already left her career in advertising sales at the Reader to manage the Life in Hell Co./Acme Features Syndicate full time, which managed syndication and merchandising for Groening's Life in Hell cartoons. The gift line included t-shirts, mugs, calendars, and greeting cards. With Deborah's management and promotional talents his cartoon went from being published in 11 free weeklies to over 250 papers nationwide. In 1986, after Matt and Deborah had married, they published Work is Hell plus two calendars, one with cartoonist Lynda Barry. Matt's books soon drew the attention of Pantheon/Randomhouse, which obtained the rights to distribute the books and in 1989 Life in Hell Cartoon Co/Acme closed its doors.

Life in Hell reached the attention of Hollywood producer James L. Brooks, who received one strip—"The Los Angeles Way of Death" from 1982—as a gift from fellow producer Polly Platt. In 1985, Brooks contacted Groening with the proposition of developing a series of short animated skits, called "bumpers", for The Tracey Ullman Show. Originally, Brooks had wanted Groening to adapt his Life in Hell characters for the show. Fearing the loss of ownership rights to his characters, Groening instead created an entirely new batch of characters: the Simpsons.

As television began to place more demands on his time, however, Groening came to almost exclusively feature single-panel strips or 16-panel grids in which Akbar and Jeff exchange terse jabs. This later period also saw the increase of autobiographical strips, perhaps because Groening was influenced by this burgeoning trend in alternative comics.

Television has also made the strip "safe enough for a number of newspapers to print", according to Groening, who says he has not "toned the strip down at all, other than no longer using profanity" as a concession to daily papers that carry the strip.

On December 7, 1998, Groening registered the domain mattgroening.com to publish Life in Hell online; however, the website has remained in its "under construction" state since then, although Groening insists he will "get around to it ... [when he is] ready to wade in on a regular basis." As of May 20, 2021, the domain leads to sponsored ad listings with a "This page is under construction - Coming soon!" message in the top right corner below the Network Solutions banner.

Groening decided in 2007, in the wake of the 2006 United States elections, to write "Life Is Swell" above the comic instead of "Life in Hell". Though Groening had previously stated that he would never give up the comic strip, in 2009 he indicated that due to troubling times for print newspapers and constant involvement with The Simpsons and Futurama, he would likely one day drop the strip. Three years later, Groening announced the strip's conclusion and the final new strip ran on June 16, 2012. The final strip shows Akbar or Jeff dancing naked, while the other tells him to stop. At the end of the strip he gives up and dances along with him, saying "Well, I tried."

Format

The strip was published in a perfect square, unlike most Sunday strips which are published in rectangles. He had different types of format. He would make 4 rows of boxes, each row with 4 in it, when Akbar and Jeff were discussing love. He did 3 boxes by 3, very rarely did he use 4 boxes. Single boxes were often quick and comedic, and 4 x 4 boxes often had a storyline. This is based on the way Lynda Barry made comics when they were in college, and the way it was published originally in the Reader. Atop each strip, he quickly writes out "Life in Hell" and Copyright Matt Groening and the year it was made. Sometimes though, he changed the way he wrote the title on top. Instead of being quickly written, sometimes it would be in balloons, or bubble letters, or fireworks, old English handwriting, etc., he also wrote "This is your" above the "Life in Hell." He also sometimes changed the way he wrote his name and date but not very often. In one strip "Why men growl" from 1982, he wrote his name as Matt Grrrrroening. In another strip, "Are you Easily Provoked?" He misspelled his name 3 times until getting it right and writing "godamnit" underneath. If he gets help from another cartoonist, he writes their names underneath his. Sometimes a message such as "My back feels better, thank you" would appear. He sometimes put where he was when he was making the strip; he'd write Chicago or Portland underneath his name.

Characters
Binky is a stressed and thus "normal" rabbit and star of the cartoon. He usually embodies dread and alienation. Binky is usually stuck in a dead end job, has a bad apartment and regularly sees a therapist. Binky is usually full of wise old sayings.
Sheba is Binky's estranged girlfriend. Her character design is "basically Binky in drag". Binky and Sheba met at a coffee shop in a 1981 storyline, and are often used as a generic couple whenever Groening needs one.
Bongo is Binky's illegitimate son, the product of a drunken night of "jungle passion." He was introduced in a 1983 storyline in which his mother, Hulga, left him to Binky so she could seek her fortune in New York. Bongo's defining physical attribute is his one ear, which Groening admits is solely so that the casual viewer can tell him apart from Binky. Bongo made an appearance in the Futurama episode "Xmas Story", where he is seen being sold in a pet shop. He also appeared in The Simpsons episode "Treehouse of Horror XII" as one of the rabbits that Homer catches in the trap. He appears in The Simpsons again in another episode as a plush toy in Lisa's room, though he is called Madam Bunny. He is shown as a plush toy in "The Fool Monty" where Mr. Burns is eating it in Bart's closet.  He has a cameo in "Simpsorama" as one of the rabbit-like creatures rampaging New New York, where he writes on a wall "Crossovers are hell".
Akbar & Jeff are described in various strips and interviews as "either brothers or lovers — or both. Whatever offends you most, that’s what they are". In one interview, Groening says they are gay. They have large noses and wear fezzes and Charlie Brown-like striped shirts. They have run numerous businesses over the years, including Akbar & Jeff's Tofu Hut, Akbar & Jeff's Earthquake T-shirt Hut, and Akbar & Jeff's Bootleg "Akbar & Jeff" T-shirt Hut. Like Binky and Sheba, Akbar and Jeff are often used as a generic couple when needed. According to Groening, "the reason why I draw a strip with Akbar and Jeff instead of Binky and Sheba is that I figure that no one can accuse me of trying to score points against men or women if the characters are identical." They have been given cameo appearances in The Simpsons, such as during "Homer's Triple Bypass", where Homer uses finger puppets resembling the characters to describe his surgery to Bart and Lisa.
Matt Groening appears in the strip as a bearded, bespectacled rabbit. He is also sometimes represented as Binky.
Will and Abe are Matt Groening's two sons, represented in rabbit form. They usually talk about vampires, zombies, and other child-fantasy topics.
Snarla, a cat, is Bongo's classmate and love interest. She bears a resemblance to Lisa Simpson.
Bart Simpson, has never spoken—except when he uttered his former catch phrase "Don't have a cow, man!" in a "forbidden words" strip—but is seen in the background of a number of strips.
Mr. Simpson is Binky's anthropomorphic dog boss at his job. His name predates The Simpsons.
Gooey, Screwy, and Ratatouille are Akbar and/or Jeff's triplet nephews.  The names are an obvious spoof of the Disney characters Huey, Dewey and Louie (Donald Duck's nephews).

Recurring jokes and situations
Fake magazines such as "Lonely Tyrant: The magazine for abusive bosses whose employees hate their guts". Stories inside include, "The fine art of the meaningless memo".
The X types of Y: The 9 types of college teachers, the 81 types of high school students, the 16 types of brothers, the 9 types of relationships.
How-To Guides:  Examples include "So You Want to Be an Unrecognized Genius", "How to Be a Clever Film Critic", and "How to Get into the College of Your Choice".
Miniseries – A series of strips focusing on a particular theme in a mock textbook manner, such as "School is Hell" and "Love is Hell", both of which have been collected in their entirety in book form.
Akbar & Jeff discussing their relationship – Arguably the most common set-up. A 1992 strip, "The Dart Game of Love", was prefaced with "I hope this cartoon pleases you gripers who whined about all those Akbar & Jeff strips where they stared at each other."
Binky attempting to meditate
Advertisements for disreputable businesses run by Akbar & Jeff such as "Akbar & Jeff's Lucky Psychic Hut".
Bongo locked in a detention room or orphanage - Usually, with 1 or 2 pairs of eyes watching him.
Bongo unsatisfied with the huge assortment of presents he has received on Christmas morning
Shadow rabbit – Binky's looming shadow towers over Bongo, who has clearly committed a crime despite his assurances to the contrary. Several of Bongo's excuses parodied those of politicians, such as "Mistakes were made". Occasionally there would also be a shadow Akbar & Jeff looming over Bongo and their nephews, or Binky looming over Bongo, Jeff, and Akbar, whom are pointing fingers at each other. One comic showed Bongo's shadow looming over Binky.
Pledge of Allegiance: Bongo's class is forced to recite the Pledge of Allegiance. Bongo intentionally butchers the Pledge, usually criticizing the government in the process ("and to the Republicans which I can't stand"). One strip, released after the death of musician Frank Zappa in 1993, has Bongo replacing most of the words of the Pledge with names of Zappa albums ("With yellow sharks and hot rats for all"). The comic would always end with Bongo's teacher angrily leering at him, and often Bongo would be tied to his desk and gagged as punishment.
Forbidden Words – An annual compilation of buzzwords used over the past year that Groening has deemed "forbidden". This topic was the first ever comic by Groening, published in 1980. These also appear in Simpsons annuals.
"How to draw Binky" - Often comedic ways on how to draw Binky, usually one of which is drawing randomly with your eyes closed.

Merchandise and advertising
After the success of Love Is Hell, Deborah Caplan, later Groening's wife, published Work Is Hell and two calendars, one in collaboration with cartoonist Lynda Barry. The books caught the attention of Pantheon/Randomhouse who wanted to expand the market for his books to include bookstores nationwide. The Life in Hell Cartoon Co. reserved the right to continue to sell the books to hip novelty and comic book stores along with the line of novelty items the couple had produced over the previous 5 years.

In addition to the books, the comic also spawned T-shirts, sweatshirts, greeting cards, posters, coffee mugs, and a short-lived newsletter called the "Life in Hell Times".

In the late 1980s, Groening drew several print advertisements for Apple Computer in the form of Life in Hell comic strips.

In 1989, after the birth of their first son, Deborah Caplan Groening and Matt decided to end their business because Deborah wanted to focus on motherhood and Matt was launching his career in television.

At the 2005 Comic-Con in San Diego, a series of deluxe Life in Hell vinyl figurines manufactured by CritterBox Toys was announced.

Binky and Bongo appear as background and enemy characters in the Simpsons arcade video game (coin-op).

Books
1984 – Love Is Hell –
1986 – Work Is Hell –
1987 – School Is Hell –
1988 – Box Full of Hell –
1988 – Childhood Is Hell –
1989 – Greetings from Hell –
1989 – Akbar and Jeff's Guide to Life –
1990 – The Big Book of Hell –
1991 – With Love From Hell –
1991 – How to Go to Hell –
1992 – The Road to Hell –
1994 – Binky's Guide to Love –
1994 – Love Is Hell: Special Ultra Jumbo 10th Anniversary Edition –
1997 – The Huge Book of Hell –
2007 – Will and Abe's Guide to the Universe –

References

External links
Life In Hell References On The Simpsons
Life In Hell at Don Markstein's Toonopedia. Archived from the original on August 31, 2015.

1977 comics debuts
2012 comics endings
American comic strips
Black comedy comics
Comics about animals
Comics about rabbits and hares
Humor comics
Gag-a-day comics
Satirical comics
Metafictional comics
Autobiographical comics
Slice of life comics
Comics set in the 1970s
Comics set in the 1980s
Comics set in the 1990s
Comics set in the 2000s
Comics set in the 2010s
Works by Matt Groening
Underground comix
LGBT-related comic strips
2012 disestablishments in the United States
American satire
American political satire